Pityrodia pungens is a flowering plant in the mint family Lamiaceae and is endemic to the northern part of the Northern Territory. It is an erect, spreading shrub with narrow, prickly leaves and off-white, bell-like flowers with dark purple streaks.

Description
The flowers are arranged singly in upper leaf axils and are shorter than the leaves. The upper lobes are shorter than or about equal to the length of the sepals. The lower middle lobe is larger than the others. The petals are glabrous except for soft hairs on the outside of the petal lobes and a dense hairy ring below the stamens. The four stamens extend slightly beyond the end of the tube, the lower pair slightly longer than the other one.

Taxonomy and naming
Pityrodia pungens was first formally described in 1979 by Ahmad Abid Munir from a specimen collected in the Nitmiluk National Park. The description was published in Journal of the Adelaide Botanic Gardens. The specific epithet (pungens) is a Latin word meaning "sharp", "acrid",
"biting" or "piercing".

Distribution
This pityrodia occurs in the northern part of the Northern Territory.

Conservation
Pityrodia pungens is classified as "least concern" under the Territory Parks and Wildlife Conservation Act 2000.

References

pungens
Plants described in 1979
Flora of the Northern Territory